Qışlaq (also, Gishlagh, Kishlak, and Kyshlak) is a village in the Jabrayil Rayon of Azerbaijan.

References 

Populated places in Jabrayil District